Andrew Richard Oram (born 7 March 1975) is a former English cricketer.  Oram was a right-handed batsman who bowled right-arm medium pace.  He was born in Northampton, Northamptonshire.

Oram made his first-class debut for Nottinghamshire against the touring Australians in 1997.  From 1997 to 1998, he represented the county in 19 first-class matches, the last of which came against Gloucestershire in the County Championship.  In his 19 first-class matches, he took 57 wickets at a bowling average of 29.00, with best figures of 4/37.

His List-A debut for Nottinghamshire came against Derbyshire in 1997.  From 1997 to 1998, he represented the county in 20 List-A matches, the last of which came against Lancashire.  In his 20 List-A matches for the county he took 33 wickets at an average of 31.17, with best figures of 4/45.

In 2009, Oram represented Bedfordshire in a single Minor Counties Championship match against Cumberland.

References

External links
Andrew Oram at Cricinfo
Andrew Oram at CricketArchive

1975 births
Living people
Cricketers from Northampton
English cricketers
Nottinghamshire cricketers
Bedfordshire cricketers